CSQ may refer to:
 Centrale des syndicats du Québec, a Canadian trade union
 Conseil de la Souveraineté du Québec, a nonpartisan association for independence of Quebec, now renamed to Organisations unies pour l'indépendance (OUI).
 Conservatory String Quartet, a Canadian string quartet 
 The airport code for Creston Municipal Airport
 The ISO 639-3 code for Croatian Sign Language